This is a list of demolished buildings and structures in New York City. Over time, countless buildings have been built in what is now New York City. Some of them still stand today and can be viewed – however, many buildings have since been demolished. The reason for the demolition was often a lack of space; a larger building could fit. Many times the condition of the building was no longer adequate. The cost of building renovation is high, and demolition may have been easier.

Sometimes its style was outdated. However, opinions may change. Artistic standards of the time of construction, of demolition, of today, and of tomorrow may all disagree. Thus, many consider it detrimental to demolish buildings that were built to high artistic standards of their own time.

Accurate records of demolished buildings were not always preserved, so this list is presumably fragmentary.

Banks, financial buildings

Churches

Christian churches

Synagogues

Forts

Hospitals

Hotels

Industrial buildings

Mansions

Museums, exhibition space, libraries

Office buildings, tenement houses, skyscrapers

Operas

Prisons

Railway stations

Shopping malls

Stadiums, sport buildings

Theatres

Villages

Other buildings

Other structures

References

Literature 
 Nathan Silver: Lost New York, Rare Book Cellar, 1967, First Edition; Third Printing,

Related pages 
 List of tallest voluntarily demolished buildings
 Architecture of New York City
 Early skyscrapers

Other links 
 https://www.bygonely.com/new-york-city-demolished-buildings-landmarks/
 https://ny.curbed.com/2019/12/12/21011629/new-york-buildings-demolition-decade-photo-essay
 https://www.nyc-architecture.com/GON/GON.htm
 https://www.businessinsider.com/demolished-new-york-buildings-2014-9
 https://www.mentalfloss.com/article/63413/15-new-york-citys-lost-landmarks
 https://hu.pinterest.com/gerrygouy/demolished-new-york/
 http://stuffnobodycaresabout.com/2015/06/10/20-historic-buildings-that-were-demolished/

Lists of demolished buildings and structures